Internalized sexism takes the form of sexist behaviors and attitudes enacted by women toward themselves or other women and girls. On a larger scale, internalized sexism falls under the broad topic of internalized oppression, which "consists of oppressive practices that continue to make the rounds even when members of the oppressor group are not present." Internalized sexism can cause a wide range of effects, for instance problems with one’s mental health and body image. Modes of internalization of sexism include early childhood inculturation and consumption of media, while language can also moderate power imbalances between groups and perpetuate internalized sexism.

Effects 
Internalized sexism has the potential to lead to body issues, lack of self-confidence, competition, and a sense of powerlessness. It is a major setback in resolving issues of sexism as a whole. Ties to psychological distress such as anxious, depressive or somatic symptoms, have been identified as results of internalized sexism. Possible effects can be depression and suicidal impulses.

Additionally, studies have found connections between sexual objectification as a result of internalized sexism and body shame, sexual objectification, and disordered eating. Internalized sexism also plays a role in lowered academic goals and diminished job performance.  On a larger scale, the presence of internalized sexism in the world is believed to alienate those affected from each other and thus further promotes continued sexism as a whole.

Types

Internalized misogyny

Misogyny is the hatred of, contempt for, or prejudice against women or girls. Women who experience internalized misogyny may express it through minimizing the value of women, mistrusting women, and believing gender bias in favor of men. Women, after observing societal beliefs which demean the value and skills of women repeatedly, eventually internalize those misogynistic beliefs and apply them to themselves and other women. Internalized misogyny can be enacted on others through assertions of incompetence, competitive banter, construction of women as competitors, construction of women as objects, and invalidation and derogation of others or oneself. The implications of internalized misogyny include psychological disorders such as depression, eating disorders, low self-esteem, and less social support among women.

The Internalized Misogyny Scale (IMS) was created to assess one’s internalized misogyny. It consists of 17 items measuring three factors: devaluation of women, distrust of women, and gender bias in favor of men. Its validity has been assessed and supported through multiple studies. Internalized misogyny assessed via the IMS has been found to be related to lower self-esteem, less social support, and more psychological distress among women living in America, and to negative body image, depression, low self-esteem, and less psychosexual adjustment among lesbian and bisexual women. The distrust of women subscale includes statements such as ‘It is generally safer not to trust women too much’ and ‘When it comes down to it a lot of women are deceitful.’ The devaluation of women subscale includes statements such as ‘Women seek to gain power by getting control over men’ and ‘women exaggerate problems they have at work.’ The valuing men over women subscale includes items such as ‘I prefer to work for a male boss’ and ‘The intellectual leadership of a community should be largely in the hands of men.’

Internalized misogyny may manifest differently depending on one’s social and political identities; for instance, internalized misogynoir has been identified as a type of internalized oppression which results from the combination of internalized racism and internalized misogyny. Similarly, lesbians may face the combined effects of internalized misogyny and internalized homophobia as a result of their intersectional identities.

Internalized heterosexism
Dawn M. Szymanski and colleagues write: 

Internalized heterosexism is generally defined as the internalization of assumptions, negative attitudes and stigma regarding homosexuality by individuals who do not identify within the heteronormative spectrum and/or are categorized as sexual minorities to varying degrees. Internalized heterosexism is a manifestation of internalized sexism that primarily affects sexual minority populations (composed of people who identify lesbian, gay, bisexual, transgender, questioning, or other), however, it can also affect heterosexual populations by dictating how they interact with and relate to non-heterosexual peoples. This phenomenon manifests when sexual minorities begin to adopt rigid heteronormative values into their worldviews.

Examples of these heteronormative values are fundamentalist religious doctrines that condemn non-heterosexual orientations and activities, concepts of masculinity and manhood that emphasize restricted emotionality (scholastically referred to as RE), or restrictive affectionate behavior between men (scholastically referred to as RABBM).  The internalization of heteronormativity often create gender role conflicts (GRCs) for people whose actions fall outside the parameters of acceptable cultural norms that promote unrealistic and constricting ideas about what it means to be a man or a woman in modern society.  One of the most common consequences of internalized heterosexism is intense depression fueled by self-loathing and sexual repression.

Toxic femininity, Tradwives, and Marianismo
Brenda R. Weber uses the term toxic femininity for a code of conformity and social pressure to rigid feminine gender roles, reinforced through (sometimes unconscious) beliefs, such as viewing oneself as unworthy, and imperatives to be consistently pleasant, accommodating, and compliant. According to Weber, such beliefs and expectations  there is no a priori female self" apart from the needs and desires of men and boys. Weber associates these norms with "usually white, mostly middle-class, relentlessly heterosexual, and typically politically conservative" expectations of femininity.

In her book, Sisters in Hate: American Women and White Extremism (2020), Seyward Darby discusses the onset of the tradwife aesthetic (a neologism of "traditional wife" or "traditional housewife"), depicted by Darby through interviews with women who self-identify as far-right extremists. In a series of interviews, Darby discusses with three women their personal view of themselves as docile, passive, and submissive in a male-dominated household. Darby also discusses her own observations and evidence of the interviewees' advocacy of tenants of the USian political far-right, including white supremacy, antisemitism, and other ultraconservative beliefs. Additionally, New York Times columnist Annie Kelly suggested two years before the release of Darby's book that similarities between tradwife aesthetic and white supremacist beliefs existed. Specifically, conspiracy theories over the white demographic decline in the United States in an attempt to encourage white women to increase pregnancy to offset the declining birthrate. One of those interviewed in Darby's book also declares that “her primary duty is having children and supporting her husband." 

While those who follow tradwife aesthetic have suggested that it is simply an anti-feminist ideal of a simpler time in the 1950s, which supports a return to traditional family values, some feminists note that tradwives neglect to consider that it is feminism allows the current choice of being a housewife to begin with:I say this knowing how lucky I am to be a housewife in 2015 as opposed to 1955. Would I be enjoying it so much without washing machines, dishwashers, supermarkets or disposable nappies? Definitely not. My love of the job has nothing to do with a nostalgia for a past in which, for a start, my lifestyle was inconceivable, and women were going silently mad in their impeccably dusted homes. I can enjoy being a homechief without a supply of Valium precisely because I know it doesn’t have to be forever.Roopika Risam writes that charges of toxic femininity have become an Internet meme, exemplary of tensions between feminists online over the concept of intersectionality, and directed primarily towards non-white feminists who are seen as disruptive of mainstream feminist discussions. For example, the writer Michelle Goldberg has criticized online call-out culture as "toxic," likening it to feminist Jo Freeman's concept of "trashing."

Marianismo is a term developed by Evelyn Stevens in a 1973 essay as a direct response to the male word machismo. The ideas within marianismo include those of feminine passivity, sexual purity, and moral strength. Stevens defines marianismo as "the cult of female spiritual superiority, which teaches that women are semidivine, morally superior to and spiritually stronger than men." Hispanic-American feminists have criticized the concept of marianismo as it is often presented the opposite of machismo, which thus puts femininity "the realm of passivity, chastity, and self-sacrifice."

Hostile and ambivalent sexism 
Social psychologists Peter Glick and Susan Fiske have posed a theory of ambivalent sexism, which presents two types of sexism: hostile and benevolent. Hostile sexism reflects misogyny and is expressed more blatantly to the observer. Benevolent sexism, on the other hand, appears much more positive and innocent to the observer, and possibly even to the receiver as well. However, benevolently sexist statements and actions end up implying sexist notions or stereotypes. Glick and Fiske elaborate on the definition of benevolent sexism in their paper:We define benevolent sexism as a set of interrelated attitudes toward women that are sexist in terms of viewing women stereotypically and in restricted roles but that are subjectively positive in feeling tone (for the perceiver) and also tend to elicit behaviors typically categorized as prosocial (e.g., helping) or intimacy-seeking (e.g., self-disclosure) (Glick & Fiske, 1996, p. 491).

[Benevolent sexism is] a subjectively positive orientation of protection, idealization, and affection directed toward women that, like hostile sexism, serves to justify women’s subordinate status to men (Glick et al., 2000, p. 763).

Modes of internalization

Early childhood inculturation

Just as misogyny can be acquired through multiple external sources, internalized misogyny can be learned from those same external forces, in a converse way. Internalized sexism may be promoted through the demeaning of men and women on the basis of their gender in relation to societal and behavioral standards. Internalized misogyny is learned in tandem with female socialization, the idea that young girls are taught to act and behave differently than their male counterparts. These same societal and behavioral standards are also thought to be spread through exposure in the media, which reflects the standards of the society that it serves to inform and entertain.

Internalized sexism is learned primarily during adolescence through socialization into gender related practices. The time period between ages 11–14 has been identified as the most vulnerable period for girls in the United States in terms of internalization of sexism. The social cognitive theory of gender development and differentiation elaborates on this socialization process; it describes that young girls learn gender-related behaviors, attitudes, and preferences by modeling others’ gender-linked behaviors, learning from the effects of one’s own gender-linked behaviors, and/or learning from direct instructions how to practice gender-linked behaviors. Young children are more likely to adopt gender-linked behaviors when they are rewarded, or see someone else rewarded, for that behavior. For example, a girl might wear more stereotypically feminine clothing after learning that conforming to society’s expectations of what she should wear leads to social and personal rewards. This process continues as young women face increasing amounts of pressure to conform to the norms of adult women. Thus, internalized sexism is practiced and spread through a range of social situations and influences, including through everyday interaction with peers.

Television and cinema
There is a long-lasting connection between misogyny and mass media. Comedic sitcoms often portray men degrading the value of women and commenting on women's weight and size. This contributes to the internalization of gender size stereotypes, sometimes negatively affecting the mental and physical health of females. One of the primary problems in mass media is the under-representation of women in widely consumed productions.

The context of children's entertainment is especially pernicious because young minds are highly impressionable and cartoons have been known to play a pedagogical role in childhood development. The Little Mermaid has been criticized because it tells a story of a young woman, Ariel, who gives up her natural identity as a mermaid in order to meet the preferences of her love interest, a human male.

Language and communication 
Differences in communication across genders is influenced by internalized sexism portrayed in everyday conversation. The main target of internalized sexism are predominantly women who are regarded as inferior. In everyday conversation, women are scrutinized by objectification, called derogatory terms, or invalidated not just by men, but other women as well. Other forms of language use toward women include the use of derogatory terms, such as "bitch," "slut," and "hoe," as forms of invalidation. These terms are used as a form of gender role policing for women who defy gender norms or hold more assertive and vocal qualities. The latter two in particular is an example of slut-shaming, which, either consciously or unconsciously, is prevalent in discussions surrounding women. These conversational practices objectify, invalidate and perpetuate internalized sexism.

There are significant differences in language use between genders. Language can also act as a moderator of the maintenance of power imbalance between groups. Derogation and criticism perpetuate social stigma, which then become internalized by those affected. They become critical of themselves and members of their own gender or diminish their own voices. This is known as horizontal oppression, influenced by systematic invalidation and internal dynamics of internalized sexism.

Combating internalized sexism 
Research on interventions and techniques which effectively combat internalized sexism is scarce despite the ubiquity of this phenomenon. However, raising awareness of internalized sexism and the mechanisms behind it enables women to recognize and impede their own internalized sexism. For instance, this awareness may discourage women from participating in derogation of fellow women and encourage them to support other women rather than treat them as competitors. Learning about internalized sexism can therefore empower and support women throughout their everyday lives.

See also 
 Bad boy archetype
 Campaign for the Feminine Woman
 Culture of Domesticity
 Ideal womanhood
 Internalized racism
 Internalized oppression
 Kinder, Küche, Kirche
 María Clara
 Molly Mormon
 Mythopoetic Men's Movement
 Self-hatred
 The Angel in the House
 The Stepford Wives
 Toxic masculinity
 Yamato nadeshiko

References 

Sexism